Sok Samnang (born January 18, 1995 in Cambodia) is a footballer for Preah Khan Reach Svay Rieng in the Cambodian League.

International career
He has represented Cambodia at senior international level.
He scored his first goal for u-23 national team against Philippines on 23 July 2017 during AFC U-23 Championship qualification tournament.

International goals

Cambodia U23

Honours

Club
Svay Rieng
Cambodian League: 2013
Hun Sen Cup: 2011, 2012, 2015,2017

References

External links
 

1995 births
Living people
Cambodian footballers
Cambodia international footballers
Preah Khan Reach Svay Rieng FC players
Association football forwards
Competitors at the 2017 Southeast Asian Games
Southeast Asian Games competitors for Cambodia